Nasya is a feminine given name of Hebrew origin meaning "miracle of Yahweh".  Its variant forms include: Nasiah, Nasiya, Nasiyah, Nasyah, and Naysa. Derived names are Nacia (Polish), Nadjae, Nadjah, Nagwa, Nagwah, Nainsey, Nainsi, Naissa (French), Naja (Arabic), Najae, Najah (Arabic), Najee, Najei, Najja, Najwa (Arabic), Nakee, Nakey, Nakeya, Nakeyah, Naki.

References

Feminine given names